Nigeria is the most populous country in Africa and the sixth in the world.

Approximately 50% of Nigerians are urban dwellers, with the rate of urbanisation being estimated at 4.3%. Nigeria is home to over 250 ethnic groups, with over 500 languages, and the variety of customs, and traditions among them gives the country great cultural diversity. The three largest ethnic groups are the Hausa, 25% of the population; along with the Yoruba, 21%; and Igbo, 18%. The Ijaw, Efik, Ibibio, Annang, and Ogoni constitute other Southern populations. The Tiv, Urhobo-Isoko, Edo and Itsekiri inhabit Nigerian's Midwest. Over 1 million people living in Nigeria (0.5% of its total population, or 1 in every 200 people living in Nigeria) are from a continent other than Africa. 800,000 people living in Nigeria are from India, 100,000 people from the United States, 75,000 people from Lebanon, 60,000 people from China and 16,000 people from the United Kingdom.

Most of the population is a young population, with 42.54% between the ages of 0–14. There is also a very high dependency ratio of the country at 88.2 dependants per 100 non-dependants.
Three of the main religious groups are Muslim estimated at 45%, Christian at 45% and other indigenous beliefs at 10%. The predominantly Christian Igbo are found in the southeast. Roman Catholicism is the largest Christian denomination in Igboland, but Anglicanism is also strong, as are Pentecostal and other Evangelical denominations.

Persons of different ethnic backgrounds most commonly communicate in English, although knowledge of two or more Nigerian languages is widespread. Hausa, Igbo and Yoruba are the most widely used Nigerian languages. Nigerian Pidgin is used widely as an unofficial medium of communication especially in the Nigerian cities of Warri, Sapele, Ughelli, Benin and Port Harcourt.

Population

Nigeria's population has been increasing rapidly for at least the last 5 decades due to very high birth rates, quadrupling its population during this time. Growth was fastest in the 1980s, after child mortality dropped rapidly. It has slowed slightly since then as both the birth rate and total fertility, rate have declined marginally since a 1978 peak. According to the 2017 revision of the World Population Prospects the total population was 185,989,640 in 2016, compared to only 37,860,000 in 1950. The proportion of children under the age of 15 in 2010 was 44.0%, 53.2% were between 15 and 65 years of age, while 2.7% were 65 years or older. There is a large degree of population momentum, with 3.2 per cent growth leading to the projected population.

The federal government has not elected to implement the type of controversial family planning programs that have reduced population growth of other developing nations, a result of low political support for these programs and a cultural preference for large families as well as high levels of social instability. Rising educational levels and health care improvements may enable future parents to plan for smaller families.

The former Nigeria's chairman of National Population Commission, Eze Duruiheoma, delivering Nigeria's statement in New York City on sustainable cities, human mobility and international migration in the 51st session of Commission on Population and Development, said that "Nigeria remains the most populous in Africa, the seventh globally with an estimated population of over 198 million. The World Population Prospects predicts that by 2050, Nigeria will become the third most populated country in the world. Over the last 50 years, Nigeria's urban population has grown at an average annual growth rate of more than 6.5% without commensurate increases in social amenities and infrastructure." He also stated that the population "grew substantially from 17.3% in 1967 to 49.4% in 2017."

Population by sex and age group (Census 2006)

Population by age group (estimates 1.VII.2016)

Population by age group (estimates 1.VII.2020)

Fertility and births
Total fertility rate (TFR) (Wanted TFR) and crude birth rate (CBR):

Fertility data as of 2013 (DHS Program):

Source: Demographic and Health Surveys (DHS)

Fertility rate by state

∗ MICS surveys

Contraceptive prevalence
Contraceptive prevalence, any methods (% of women ages 15–49)

∗ UNICEFs state of the worlds children and child info, United Nations population divisions world contraceptive use, household surveys including demographic and health surveys and multiple indicator cluster surveys.

Population projections
The total population in sub-Saharan Africa is projected to increase to almost one billion people, making it the most populated region outside of South-Central Asia. According to the United Nations, the population of Nigeria will reach 411 million by 2050. Nigeria might then be the 3rd most populous country in the world. In 2100, the population of Nigeria may reach 794 million. While the overall population is expected to increase, the growth rate is estimated to decrease from 1.2 per cent per year in 2010 to 0.4 per cent per year in 2050. The birth rate is also projected to decrease from 20.7 to 13.7, while the death rate is projected to increase from 8.5 in 2010 to 9.8 in 2050. Life expectancy is expected to increase from 67.0 years in 2010 to 75.2 years in 2050. By 2050, 69.6% of the population is estimated to be living in urban areas compared to 50.6% in 2010.

Vital statistics
Registration of vital events in Nigeria is not complete. The Population Department of the United Nations prepared the following estimates (UN World Population Prospects 2022).

Life expectancy at birth 
Life expectancy from 1950 to 2015 (UN World Population Prospects):

Other demographic statistics 
The following demographic statistics of Nigeria in 2022 are from the World Population Review.

One birth every 4 seconds	
One death every 13 seconds	
One net migrant every 9 minutes	
Net gain of one person every 6 seconds

The following demographic statistics are from The World Factbook, unless otherwise indicated.

Population
218,541,212 (2022 est.)
203,452,505 (July 2018 est.)
178.5 million (2014 est.)
174,507,539 (July 2013 est.)

Religions
Muslim 45.5%, Roman Catholic 10.6%, other Christian 41.3%, other .6% (2018 est.)

Age structure

0–14 years: 41.7% (male 45,571,738 / female 43,674,769).
15–24 years: 20.27% (male 22,022,660 / female 21,358,753)
25–54 years: 30.6% (male 32,808,913 / female 32,686,474)
55–64 years: 4.13% (male 4,327,847 / female 4,514,264)
65 years and over: 3.3% (male 3,329,083 / female 3,733,801) (2020 est.)

0–14 years: 42.45% (male 44,087,799 / female 42,278,742)
15–24 years: 19.81% (male 20,452,045 / female 19,861,371)
25–54 years: 30.44% (male 31,031,253 / female 30,893,168)
55–64 years: 4.04% (male 4,017,658 / female 4,197,739)
65 years and over: 3.26% (male 3,138,206 / female 3,494,524) (2018 est.)

0–14 years: 42.5% (male 41,506,288 / female 39,595,720)
15–24 years: 19.6% (male 19,094,899 / female 18,289,513)
25–54 years: 30.7% (male 30,066,196 / female 28,537,846)
55–64 years: 3.9% (male 3,699,947 / female 3,870,080)
65 years and over: 3% (male 2,825,134 / female 3,146,638) (2017 est.)

0–14 years: 43.8% (male 39,127,615 / female 37,334,281)
15–24 years: 19.3% (male 17,201,067 / female 16,451,357)
25–54 years: 30.1% (male 25,842,967 / female 26,699,432)
55–64 years: 3.8% (male 3,016,896 / female 3,603,048)
65 years and over: 3% (male 2,390,154 / female 2,840,722) (2013 est.)

Birth rate
34.19 births/1,000 population (2022 est.) Country comparison to the world: 18th
35.2 births/1,000 population (2018 est.) Country comparison to the world: 20th
36.9 births/1,000 population (2017 est.) 
38.78 births/1,000 population (2013 est.)

Death rate
8.7 deaths/1,000 population (2022 est.). Country comparison to the world: 70th
9.6 deaths/1,000 population (2018 est.). Country comparison to the world: 46th
12.4 deaths/1,000 population (2017 est.)
13.2 deaths/1,000 population (2013 est.)

Total fertility rate
4.62 children born/woman (2022 est.). Country comparison to the world: 16th
4.85 children born/woman (2018 est.). Country comparison to the world: 16th
5.07 children born/woman (2017 est.).

Population growth rate
2.53% (2022 est.). Country comparison to the world: 22nd
2.54% (2018 est.). Country comparison to the world: 21st
2.43% (2017 est.). Country comparison to the world: 24th
2.54% (2013 est.)

Median age
Total: 18.6 years. Country comparison to the world: 207th
Male: 18.4 years
Female: 18.9 years (2020 est.)

Mother's mean age at first birth
20.4 years (2018 est.)
Note: median age at first birth among women 25–49

20.3 years 
Note: median age at first birth among women 25–29 (2013 est.)

Contraceptive prevalence rate 
16.6% (2018)
13.4% (2016/17)

Net migration rate
−0.21 migrant(s)/1,000 population (2022 est.). Country comparison to the world: 113rd
−0.2 migrant(s)/1,000 population (2017 est.). Country comparison to the world: 106th
−0.22 migrant(s)/1,000 population (2013 est.)

Dependency ratios 
Total dependency ratio: 88.2
Youth dependency ratio: 83
Potential support ratio: 19.4 (2015 est.)

Urbanisation
Urban population: 53.5% of total population (2022)
Rate of urbanisation: 3.92% annual rate of change (2020–25 est.)

Urban population: 50.3% of total population (2018)
Rate of urbanisation: 4.2% annual rate of change (2015–20 est.)

Life expectancy at birth
Total population: 61.33 years. Country comparison to the world: 217th
Male: 59.51 years
Female: 63.27 years (2022 est.)

Total population: 59.3 years (2018 est.)
Male: 57.5 years (2018 est.)
Female: 61.1 years (2018 est.)

Total population: 52.05 years
Male: 48.95 years
Female: 55.33 years (2012 est.)

Total population: 46.94 years
Male: 46.16 years
Female: 47.76 years (2009 est.)

Total population: 51.56 years
Male: 51.58 years
Female: 51.55 years (2000 est.)

Major infectious diseases
Degree of risk: very high (2020)
Food or waterborne diseases: bacterial and protozoal diarrhoea, hepatitis A and E, and typhoid fever
Vectorborne diseases: malaria, dengue fever, and yellow fever
Water contact diseases: leptospirosis and schistosomiasis
Animal contact diseases: rabies
Respiratory diseases: meningococcal meningitis
Aerosolised dust or soil contact diseases: Lassa fever

Note 1: on 30 September 2021, the Centers for Disease Control and Prevention issued a Travel Health Notice for a Yellow Fever outbreak in Nigeria; a large, ongoing outbreak of yellow fever in Nigeria began in September 2017; the outbreak is now spread throughout the country with the Nigerian Ministry of Health reporting cases of the disease in multiple states (Bauchi, Benue, Delta, Ebonyi, and Enugu); the CDC recommends travellers going to Nigeria should receive vaccination against yellow fever at least 10 days before travel and should take steps to prevent mosquito bites while there; those never vaccinated against yellow fever should avoid travel to Nigeria during the outbreak

Note 2: widespread ongoing transmission of a respiratory illness caused by the novel coronavirus (COVID-19) is occurring throughout Nigeria; as of 6 June 2022, Nigeria has reported a total of 256,148 cases of COVID-19 or 124.3 cumulative cases of COVID-19 per 100,000 population with a total of 3,148 cumulative deaths or a rate of 1.5 cumulative death per 100,000 population; as of 22 May 2022, 12.97% of the population has received at least one dose of COVID-19 vaccine

Note 3: on 21 March 2022, the US Centers for Disease Control and Prevention (CDC) issued a Travel Alert for polio in Africa; Nigeria is currently considered a high risk to travellers for circulating vaccine-derived polioviruses (cVDPV); vaccine-derived poliovirus (VDPV) is a strain of the weakened poliovirus that was initially included in oral polio vaccine (OPV) and that has changed over time and behaves more like the wild or naturally occurring virus; this means it can be spread more easily to people who are unvaccinated against polio and who come in contact with the stool or respiratory secretions, such as from a sneeze, of an “infected” person who received oral polio vaccine; the CDC recommends that before any international travel, anyone unvaccinated, incompletely vaccinated, or with an unknown polio vaccination status should complete the routine polio vaccine series; before travel to any high-risk destination, CDC recommends that adults who previously completed the full, routine polio vaccine series receive a single, lifetime booster dose of polio vaccine

Ethnic groups

HIV/AIDS
Adult prevalence rate: 2.8% (2017 est.)

People living with HIV/AIDS: 2.6 million (2007 est.), 3.3 million (2009 est.)

School life expectancy (primary to tertiary education)
Total: 9 years
Male: 9 years
Female: 8 years (2011)

Literacy
Definition: age 15 and over can read and write

Total population: 62%
Male: 71.3%
Female: 52.7% (2018)

Total population: 67.6%
Male: 71.2%
Female: 53.7% (2015 est.)

Total population: 78.6%
Male: 84.35%
Female: 72.65% (2010 est.)

Unemployment, youth ages 15–24
Total: 18.3%
Male: 18.4% 
Female: 18.2% (2019 est.) NA

Population distribution
Nigeria is Africa's most populous country. Significant population clusters are scattered throughout the country, with the highest density areas being in the south and southwest.

Emigration

Today millions of ethnic Nigerians live abroad, the largest communities can be found in the United Kingdom (500,000–3,000,000) and the United States (600,000–1,000,000 Nigerians), other countries that followed closely are South Africa, Gambia, and Canada respectively. There are between 90,000 and 100,000 Brazil, many of them living illegally without proper documentation. Additionally, there were around 100,000 Nigerians living in China in 2012, mostly in the city of Guangzhou, but have since declined to about 10,000 due to strict immigration enforcement by Chinese officials as many of them were known for engaging in illegal activities. There are also large groups in Ireland, Portugal and many other countries.
Inspiration for emigration is based heavily on socio-economical issues such as warfare, insecurity, economical instability and civil unrest.

Between 1400 and 1900, of 1.4 million of 2 million emigrants were slaves sent to the Americas. This is due to the fact that the land now known as Nigeria was a central point for 4 slave trades during the 19th century. Though bondage represented a great deal, an estimated 30,000 Nigerian inhabitants would relocate to Kano City and Gambia to take advantage of financial opportunities afforded by fertile land and available natural resources. What's more, the presence of gold mines and rail lines along the Gold Coast, present-day Ghana, attracted an estimated 6,500 Nigerian citizens to attain financial gain and opportunity. The population of Nigerians in Ghana rose to roughly 149,000 before the 1969 alien expulsion order would displace nearly the entire population to surrounding countries.

Religion

Nigeria is nearly equally divided between Islam and Christianity. The majority of Nigerian Muslims are Sunni and mostly live in the northern, central and south-western states of the country, while Christians dominate in some central states (especially Plateau and Benue states), and the south-east and south-south regions. Other religions practised in Nigeria include African Traditional Religion, Hinduism, Baháʼí Faith, Judaism, The Grail Movement, and the Reformed Ògbóni Fraternity, one of the traditional socio-religious institutions of the Yorùbá people and their Òrìṣà religion known as Ẹ̀sìn Òrìṣà Ìbílẹ̀ in the Yorùbá language.

According to a 2009 Pew survey, 50.4% of Nigeria's population were Muslims. A later Pew study in 2011 calculated that Christians now formed 50.8% of the population. Adherents of other religions 1% make up of the population.

The shift of population balance between Muslims and Christians is a result of northern and southern Nigeria being in different stages of demographic transition. The Muslim-dominated north is in an earlier stage of the demographic transition with much higher fertility rates than the south, whose split Christian/Muslim population is further along in the transition, and whose fertility rates are declining. Decreasing fertility can be linked to more access to education, use of contraceptives, and differing beliefs regarding family planning.

The 1999 introduction of Sharia law in twelve northern Nigerian states led to massive violence and unrest and caused an ethnic and religious rift between Sharia and Non-Sharia states, a divide that has deepened with time.

Crime

Nigeria is home to a substantial network of organised crime, active especially in drug trafficking.
Nigerian criminal groups are heavily involved in drug trafficking, shipping heroin from Asian countries to Europe and America; and cocaine from South America to Europe and South Africa.

The various Nigerian confraternities or "campus cults" are active in both organised crime and in political violence as well as providing a network of corruption within Nigeria. As confraternities have extensive connections with political and military figures, they offer excellent alumni networking opportunities. The Supreme Vikings Confraternity, for example, boasts that twelve members of the Rivers State House of Assembly are cult members.
On lower levels of society, there are the "area boys", these are organised gangs mostly active in Lagos who specialise in mugging and small-scale drug dealing. According to official statistics, gang violence in Lagos resulted in 273 civilians and 84 policemen killed in the period of August 2000 to May 2001.

"The result of factors such as endemic local corruption, which facilitates illicit trafficking; the Nigerian Civil War, which contributed to a proliferation of firearms; the oil boom of the 1970s, which led to the embezzlement of public funds; and the economic crisis of the 1980s, which was accompanied by a rise in robberies. The expansion of the Nigerian diaspora and organized crime went hand in hand. Global migration boosted prostitution, drug trafficking and fraud, the three main activities of Nigerian syndicates. The smuggling of Nigerian sex workers became a whole industry that now extends from Switzerland to France and Italy (where black prostitutes are called "fireflies"), and has even reached the Prudish Kingdom of Saudi Arabia, from which 1,000 women are said to be deported every month by the authorities."

The high crime rate among Nigerian migrants also leads to stereotyping Nigerians as criminals; thus, in Cameroon, Nigerian migrants are perceived collectively by the inhabitants of Cameroon as likely to be oil smugglers or dealers in stolen cars. In the Netherlands, the debate on Nigerian crime reached an intensity described as a "moral panic" by one scholar. In Switzerland, the crime rate of Nigerian young males was reported as 620% that of Swiss males in same age group (2009 data), the second highest crime rate of any nationality, just below that of Angolan nationals (at 630%).

Nigeria is also pervaded by political corruption. It is ranked 136 out of 168 countries in Transparency International's 2015 Corruption Perceptions Index.

See also 
 2022 Census of Nigeria

References

Further reading 

 
 
 
 
 Reed, H. E., & Mberu, B. U. (2014). Capitalizing on Nigeria's demographic dividend: reaping the benefits and diminishing the burdens. Etude de La.